The year 1813 in architecture involved some significant events.

Buildings and structures

Buildings

 The Theatre Royal, Plymouth, England, designed by John Foulston, is opened.
 3 Abbey Road, London (later a recording studio)
 Executive Mansion, Richmond, Virginia, official residence of the governor of Virginia in the United States, designed by Alexander Parris, is completed
 Palacio de Mineria in Mexico City, designed by Manuel Tolsá, is completed.
 Façade of Milan Cathedral, designed by Pellicani, is completed.

Awards
 Grand Prix de Rome, architecture: Auguste Caristie

Births
 January 6 – Charles Lanyon, English architect associated with Belfast (died 1889)
 February 23 – Ferdinand Stadler, Swiss architect (died 1870)
 July 21 – Jakub Bursa, Czech architect, folk artist and builder (died 1884)
 December 6 – August Sicard von Sicardsburg, Austrian architect (died 1868)
 date unknown – John Skipton Mulvany, Irish architect (died 1870)

Deaths
 June 6
 Alexandre-Théodore Brongniart, French architect (born 1739)
 Antonio Cachia, Maltese architect, civil and military engineer and archaeologist (born 1739)
 date unknown – Michael Searles, English Regency commercial architect (born 1750)

Architecture
Years in architecture
19th-century architecture